A metallurgical furnace, more commonly referred to as a furnace, is a device used to heat and melt metal ore to remove gangue, primarily in iron and steel production. The heat energy to fuel a furnace may be supplied directly by fuel combustion, by electricity such as the electric arc furnace, or through induction heating in induction furnaces. There are several different types of furnaces used in metallurgy to work with specific metal and ores.

Smelting furnaces 
Smelting furnaces are used in smelting to extract metal from ore. Smelting furnaces include:

 The blast furnace, used to reduce iron ore to pig iron
 Cold blast
 Hot blast
 Steelmaking furnaces, including:
 Puddling furnace
 Reverberatory furnace

 Open hearth furnace
 Basic oxygen furnace
 Electric arc furnace
 Electric induction furnace

Other furnaces 

 Furnaces used to remelt metal in foundries.
 Furnaces used to reheat and heat treat metal for use in:
 Rolling mills, including tinplate works and slitting mills.
 Forges
 Open hearth furnace
 Electric arc furnace

References 

Industrial furnaces